Kew Association Football Club is a football club based in Ham, England. They are currently members of the Southern Amateur League.

History
St Anne's Kew were founded in 1906 by St Anne's Church teacher Ken Leatherdale. Initially, the club exclusively featured players from the church, before changing their name to Kew Association in 1911, two years after joining the Middlesex County Amateur League. The club later played in the Amateur Football Association and the Southern Olympian League, before joining the Southern Amateur League in 1925. In the 1976–77 season, the same season the club entered the FA Vase for the first time, Kew Association won the Southern Amateur League. In the 2012–13 season, the club resigned from the Southern Amateur League halfway through the season. The club rejoined the league in time for the following season.

Ground
The club currently play at Ham Playing Fields in Ham in the London Borough of Richmond upon Thames.

Records
Best FA Vase performance: Third round, 1976–77

References

External links

Southern Amateur Football League
1906 establishments in England
Sport in the London Borough of Richmond upon Thames
Kew, London
Association football clubs established in 1906
Football clubs in England
Amateur association football teams
Football clubs in London